Frank Malone may refer to:

 Frank Malone (Gaelic footballer) (1903–1953), Irish Gaelic footballer
 Frank Malone (Shortland Street), a character on Shortland Street